František Tondra (4 June 1936 in Spišské Vlachy - 3 May 2012 in Košice) was the Roman Catholic bishop of the Roman Catholic Diocese of Spiš (1989-2011), Slovakia.

Ordained to the priesthood in 1962, he became bishop in 1989 and retired in 2011.

Notes

21st-century Roman Catholic bishops in Slovakia
1936 births
2012 deaths
People from Spišská Nová Ves District
20th-century Roman Catholic bishops in Slovakia